The Maple Leaf Trainer II was a  Canadian biplane trainer designed by Elsie MacGill in 1938 and manufactured by the Canadian Car and Foundry. Although it was intended for use as a basic trainer for the Royal Canadian Air Force, it was rejected and the only completed airframe was sold to Mexico, the remaining nine aircraft were later built there.

Design and development
In 1937, Canadian Car and Foundry obtained rights to the Wallace Trainer designed by Leland Stamford Wallace. The nearly-complete project was a biplane with two open cockpits, powered by a Kinner B-5 engine.  Featuring welded steel-tube fuselage, ailerons and tail with a wing structure utilizing spruce spars and ribs, the aircraft was fabric covered, except for aluminium panelled cockpit and engine areas. Canadian Car and Foundry renamed it the Maple Leaf I.

In 1938, once the Maple Leaf I was complete, the new Chief Designer Elsie McGill began work on the Maple Leaf II, which, except for the use of the fin and rudder from the earlier aircraft, was a new design. A conventional structure based on welded steel tube fuselage and steel-tube tail, aluminium alloy ribs with wooden wings was employed. Designed around British design requirements for strength, the Maple Leaf II was intended to be fully aerobatic. In order to expedite development and to ensure no interruption in the ongoing Hawker Hurricane production lines, a number of components were "farmed out" to sub-contractors.

Operational history
The Maple Leaf II prototype was ready for flight testing in October 1939; one of the unusual aspects of the program was that the designer accompanied company Sales Manager O.C.S. Wallace who acted as a test pilot on the first flight, 31 October 1939. Tests indicated excellent results with stable and docile flight characteristics, however, the RCAF test pilots felt that a basic trainer had to be more challenging.

After evaluation by the RCAF and the Department of Transport in 1940, the Maple Leaf II was exported to Mexico via Port Washington on Long Island, USA. Along with the finished prototype, two semi-complete airframes with blueprints, jigs, tools and all accessories were sold to the Mexican Air Force school (EMA). One of the "kit" aircraft was assembled and flown as the Ares 2. It differed slightly from the Maple Leaf II in having enlarged vertical tail surfaces and an uncowled engine.

In total, 10 examples were built in Mexico during 1940, and were equipped with the Warner Super Scarab 165 hp engine.

Operators

Mexican Air Force  10 units built.

Specifications (Maple Leaf Trainer II)

References

Citations

Bibliography
 
 Molson, Ken M. and Taylor, Harold A. Canadian Aircraft Since 1909. Stittsville, Ontario: Canada's Wings, 1982. .
 Ruiz Romero, Manuel. Aviación Militar: Historia de la Fuerza Aérea y de la Aviación Naval El. Mexico City: Universal, 2004.

External links
Canada Science and Technology Museum Elsie McGill

Maple Leaf
1930s Canadian military trainer aircraft